David Roland Elleray,   (born 3 September 1954), is an English former football referee who officiated in the Football League, Premier League and for FIFA. As of September 2021 he held the position of Technical Director at the IFAB.

During his career as a prominent referee, Elleray officiated for a number of notable matches, including the FA Cup Final, the highest domestic honour for an English referee. Due to his Oxbridge background and "day job" as a teacher at a public school, Elleray has been described as "schoolmasterly" and "posh" by the press. His teaching role entailed time conflicts with his role as a leading referee before his retirement. He has periodically advised football boards.

Early life
Born in Dover, Kent, Elleray was educated at Dover Grammar School for Boys where he excelled at a range of sports and started refereeing football games at the age of 13 to earn extra pocket money. He gained a scholarship to read geography at Hertford College, Oxford and was a keen rugby player and rower. While at university, he was promoted through the Hellenic, Isthmian and Panel Leagues and eventually became a referee for The Football League in 1986. He remained there until his inclusion on the original Premier League Referees' List in 1992, and also became a FIFA referee in that year.

Career
Elleray is a career geography teacher and spent over 30 years at Harrow School, where he held various leadership roles such as head of geography, director of boarding, and housemaster of Druries House before his retirement in 2009. Early in his teaching career, he was noted for controversially reintroducing football (which had not been played there since 1927) at Harrow - a school better known for its rugby and cricket traditions - in 1977.

Elleray stepped down as a FIFA-listed referee in 1999, having officiated 78 international matches in 35 countries. He officiated at Wembley Stadium 13 times but was unable to officiate at the 1998 World Cup in France due to school commitments.

During his refereeing career, Elleray is remembered for a number of incidents, including awarding a dubious penalty kick to Manchester United in the 1994 FA Cup Final against Chelsea. Elleray later admitted in his autobiography that he "blew without thinking" and although he knew he had made a mistake, he could not change his mind. He was also the referee when Ryan Giggs scored his 'wonder goal' in the 1999 FA Cup semi-final replay against Arsenal at Villa Park, and when David Beckham scored from inside his own half against Wimbledon in 1996. Even though he sent off Manchester United's Roy Keane four times, when he retired Keane sent him a letter wishing him well and a signed jersey.

Elleray was recognised by coaches, players and fans for being a firm, fair and consistent referee. After the 1994 FA Cup Final, UEFA president Lennart Johansson told Elleray: "Europe needs referees like you. I do not care whether the second penalty was a foul or not. The easy decision would to have given nothing. You showed strength and courage. Congratulations!"

In 1999, Elleray received death threats from Manchester United supporters after Liverpool made a comeback which could have prevented their team winning the title. He awarded Liverpool a dubious penalty and then sent Denis Irwin off for attempting a pass because he had not seen the official's flag, allowing Liverpool to bring the game to 2–2. Martin Edwards, the United chairman, suggested that a winners' medal be made for Elleray should Arsenal win the league. The result however did not impact United's pole position, or their winning the title that season due to Arsenal losing at Leeds a few days later. It was a considerable time before Elleray refereed United again.

In 2002, Elleray was voted onto the FA Council as the member for Independent Schools.

He retired from refereeing at the end of the 2002–03 season. His last match was Newcastle United's 1–0 win over Birmingham on 3 May 2003, during which he sent off Blues defender Matthew Upson.

Post-retirement
In 2004, Elleray accepted the position as Honorary President of the Board of the Referees' Association of England for three years, and was a FIFA and UEFA referee assessor and instructor. He was chairman of the Independent Schools Football Association.

Elleray was awarded an honorary doctorate from Sheffield Hallam University in 2010. He was appointed Member of the Order of the British Empire (MBE) in the 2014 Birthday Honours for services to football.

He has held the position of Technical Director for the International Football Association Board since at least May 2016.

One of the most recognisable figures in English football, Elleray's life featured in an award-winning documentary, The Man in Black, for Channel 4.

Bibliography

References

External links
David Elleray Referee Statistics at soccerbase.com
Sunday Times article 10 January 2010

1954 births
Living people
People from Dover, Kent
People educated at Dover Grammar School for Boys
Alumni of Hertford College, Oxford
English football referees
Schoolteachers from Kent
Members of the Order of the British Empire
English Football League referees
Premier League referees
UEFA Euro 1996 referees
Teachers at Harrow School
Sportspeople from Dover, Kent